Fanny Umphelby (1788 – 9 April 1852) was a British author who wrote a popular primer known by the shortened title The Child's Guide to Knowledge, ... by a Lady.

Life
Umphelby was born and died in London. She wrote The Child's Guide to Knowledge, ... by a Lady, but her fame is due to her nephew's intercession in adding her biography to the DNB. The 1900 Dictionary of National Biography indicates that on publication in 1825 it "became at once a standard" book in the classroom.

The book was first published as 262 Questions and Answers, with the modest attribution "by a Lady", but was later retitled in full The Child's Guide to Knowledge; Being a Collection of Useful and Familiar Questions and Answers on Every-day Subjects, Adapted for Young Persons, and Arranged in the Most Simple and Easy Language. The coy attribution caused some confusion as to authorship, with her sister, the wife of Robert Ward, often being credited for early editions of the work, although by 1900 the Dictionary of National Biography was prepared to positively assert that Umphelby was the sole original author. By 1899, The Child's Guide to Knowledge was in its 58th edition, with later editions having been updated by her nephew, Robert A. Ward.

Encyclopedias for children in varying subjects were in vogue in the early 19th century. The Oxford Companion to Children's Literature (1984) indicates that The Child's Guide to Knowledge, ... by a Lady was modeled on William Pinnock's Catechisms and Richmal Mangnall's Miscellaneous Questions for the Use of Young People. Umphelby utilized the techniques of the Elucidarium, a 12th-century encyclopedia that presented information as a Socratic dialogue between a teacher and his disciple, but varied the formula to have the pupil present the information instead of the teacher. The book caused a resurgence of popularity around books based on dialogue.

Umphelby also authored A Guide to Jewish History.

References

1788 births
1852 deaths
English women writers
19th-century women writers
19th-century English women
19th-century English people